Transcription initiation factor TFIID subunit 8 is a protein that in humans is encoded by the TAF8 gene.

This gene encodes one of several TATA-binding protein (TBP)-associated factors (TAFs), which are integral subunits of the general transcription factor complex TFIID. TFIID recognizes the core promoter of many genes and nucleates the assembly of a transcription preinitiation complex containing RNA polymerase II and other initiation factors. The protein encoded by this gene contains an H4-like histone fold domain, and interacts with several subunits of TFIID including TBP and the histone-fold protein TAF10. Alternatively spliced transcript variants have been described, but their biological validity has not been determined.

Clinical significance
Mutations of the TAF8 gene cause a neurodegenerative disorder first described in 2022 and presenting as severe psychomotor retardation with almost absent development, feeding problems, microcephaly, growth retardation, spasticity and epilepsy.

References

Further reading